is a passenger railway station located in the city of  Akō, Hyōgo Prefecture, Japan, operated by the West Japan Railway Company (JR West).

Lines

Station layout
The station consists of one ground-level side platform serving a single-directional track, with the platform on the right side when facing in the direction of Okayama. There is no station building, and the station is unattended.

Adjacent stations

|-
!colspan=5|JR West

History
Tenwa Station was opened on May 1, 1963. With the privatization of the Japan National Railways (JNR) on April 1, 1987, the station came under the aegis of the West Japan Railway Company.

Passenger statistics
In fiscal 2019, the station was used by an average of 262 passengers daily

Surrounding area
Mitsubishi Electric Ako Factory
Ako City Akonishi Elementary School
Japan National Route 250

See also
List of railway stations in Japan

References

External links

 JR West Station Official Site

Railway stations in Hyōgo Prefecture
Railway stations in Japan opened in 1963
Akō, Hyōgo